Svínáir is a village located on Eysturoy in the Faroe Islands, in Eiði Municipality. It is located 4 km north of Ljósá and 6.5 km west of Funningur. It is located 8.5 km south of Eiði, 4.6 km south of Ljósá and 2 km north of Norðskáli.

The village was founded around 1840.

Notable residents
Jógvan Poulsen (1854 — 1941), teacher, writer and politician

References

Populated coastal places in the Faroe Islands
Eiði Municipality